Yatskivka is village in Kramatorsk Raion (district) in Donetsk Oblast of eastern Ukraine, at about  north-northwest from the centre of Donetsk city, near the southern corner of the Oskil Reservoir. It belongs to Lyman Urban Hromada, one of the hromadas of Ukraine.

The village came under attack by Russian forces in 2022, during the Russian invasion of Ukraine. It was liberated by Ukrainian forces on 23 September 2022, during the 2022 Kharkiv counteroffensive.

References

Villages in Kramatorsk Raion